The list of ship decommissionings in 1978 includes a chronological list of all ships decommissioned in 1978.


See also 

1978
 Ship decommissionings
Ship